Xuân Lộc is a district of Đồng Nai province, Vietnam, in the Southeast region of the country. Located on National Highway 1 leading out of Ho Chi Minh City, it is most notable for the battle of Xuân Lộc, which took place in April 1975. This was the final large battle of the Vietnam War, where the Army of the Republic of Vietnam poured all of its reserve units in order to halt the advance of the Vietnam People's Army 4th Corps.

It also has Vietnam's largest mosque, built in 2006.

As of 2003 the district had a population of 207,773. The district capital lies at Gia Ray.

Administrative divisions
Xuân Lộc consists of 1 township, Gia Ray, and 14 communes: Bảo Hòa, Lang Minh, Suối Cao, Suối Cát, Xuân Bắc, Xuân Định, Xuân Hiệp, Xuân Hòa, Xuân Hưng, Xuân Phú, Xuân Tâm, Xuân Thành, Xuân Thọ and Xuân Trường.

References

Districts of Đồng Nai province